Artatama I was a king of the Hurrian kingdom of Mitanni in the late fifteenth century BC. His reign coincided with the reigns of Egyptian pharaohs Amenhotep II and Thutmose IV. He is believed to be the son of earlier Mitanni king Shaushtatar.

A tablet of Artatama was found at Tall Bazi granting land. Tablets were also found at Alalakh. Artatama is referred to in the Amarna letters (EA 29) as the grandfather of Tushratta and father of Shuttarna II, who established an alliance with Thutmose IV of Ancient Egypt. Facing the perils of fighting a war on two fronts, the Hittites in the north and Egypt in the south, Artatama approached Amenhotep II with an offer of peaceful division of contested lands in Syria. A peaceful resolution of an old conflict could grow into a political and military alliance, but the Egyptians suspected foul play and denied definite answer for years. At one point during the reign of Thutmose IV they proposed a marriage between Thutmose and Artatama's daughter, but for unknown reasons Artatama rejected the offer. The Egyptians had to make seven consecutive marriage proposals before Artatama finally agreed. Thus, Artatama may have been the father of Queen Mutemwiya and the maternal grandfather of Amenhotep III. Artatama was succeeded by his son Shuttarna II.

He is mentioned in the later Šattiwaza treaty between the Hittite king Šuppiluliuma I and Mitanni vassal king Šattiwaza, for example "When king Tušratta died, the Storm-god decided the legal case of Artatama: his son (= Šuttarna) brought the dead Artatama back to life.".

Notes

Hurrian kings
15th-century BC people